Lyady, Liady, or Liadi may refer to:

In Russia:
 Lyady, Russia, name of several rural localities in Russia

In Belarus:
 Lyady, Minsk Region, Smolevichi District, Minsk Region, Belarus
 Lyady, Gomel Region, Zhlobin District, Gomel Region, Belarus
 Lyady, Vitebsk Region, Dubrovna District, Vitebsk Region, Belarus, associated with the life of Shneur Zalman of Liadi, the first rebbe of Chabad Lubavitch

In Greece:
 Liadi Island, an island of Greece in the Cyclades group